Peristactis is a genus of moths belonging to the family Tineidae. It contains only one species, Peristactis taraxias, which is found in Sri Lanka.

References

Tineidae
Monotypic moth genera
Moths of Asia
Tineidae genera
Taxa named by Edward Meyrick